Metamorfosi is a village in Kilkis regional unit of Central Macedonia, Greece. Since the 2011 local government reform it is part of the municipality Paionia. Prior to 1926, it was known by the different name of Chidemli.

References

Populated places in Kilkis (regional unit)